The Buenos Aires 1859 1p "In Ps" tete-beche pair are the only existing pair of a postage stamp error on a tête-bêche pair of stamps issued by the government of the State of Buenos Aires and one of philately's great rarities. One cliché, in position 33 (row 5, stamp 1), was replaced upside down relative to its neighbours and is paired with the correct orientation stamp from position 41 (row 6, stamp 1).

History
Stamps known as the Barquitos issue, named for the little ships that form the central image of the stamps, were first issued in April 1858 denominated in 2, 3, 4 and 5-peso values in blue, green, red and orange. In October postal rates were reduced, making it necessary to produce two additional stamps. Owing to time constraints it was decided to modify the 4 and 5-peso denominations to make the 1 peso and 4 reales (half-peso) respectively. Forgeries of the regular stamps exist and were already well documented in 1882.

The original plates were constructed of 48 stereotype clichés, eight stamps wide and six stamps deep, affixed to a wooden base with a small brass nail in each corner of the clichés. The nails show up as white holes in the design, having been recessed below the level of each metal cliché. The value tablets remained solid on the master dies and from these four matrices the four values were made. Each matrix had the denomination cut into the solid areas: "Dos Ps", "Tres Ps", "Cuato Ps" [sic] and "Cinco Ps". From these the 48 clichés were stereotyped and affixed to the wood base. Unique affixing holes and flaws make it possible to identify different plate positions.

In June 1864, the fact that there were some modifications to the plates of these stamps was already mentioned in the world's first dedicated stamp journal, Stamp Collectors' Review and Monthly Advertiser.

Even the regular stamps were considered a great classic and highly prized, as evidenced by being the highest priced stamps listed in the 1868 issue of the Scott Postage Stamp Catalogue, and by the 1940 edition were valued at $3,000.

Modifications
To make the two new denominations, each cliché was altered. The 5-peso value was turned into a 1-peso by modifying the text "Cinco Ps", removing the "C" and "co" to make it read "In Ps". The 4-peso was turned into a 4-reales by removing part of the "Cuato Ps" text. First the lower curve of the "P" was excised, making it read "rs", and later it was modified again by removing the "Cu" and "o" of "Cuato", making it read "T rs", the closest approximation of "1 rs".

Provenance
This pair were exhibited in 1986 as part of the Aristocrats of Philately displays at Ameripex and again at Anphilex in 1996. They were previously owned by Alfred H. Caspary until 1958, Lars Amundsen, Joseph Schatzkés, John Robert Boker, Jr., and Gabriel Sanchez. They were also illustrated in Leon Norman Williams' Encyclopedia of Rare and Famous Stamps. The Caspary vertical tete-beche pair sold in 2008 at auction for $575,000 dollars.

A second example
The only example known is the vertical pair, but another pair, in horizontal format, being positions 33 and 34, was recorded in Philipp von Ferrary's collection. It was acquired by Alfred F. Lichtenstein, who exhibited it in 1940 at the centenary celebrations of the postage stamp, by the Collectors Club of New York. It has not been seen since and was not in the Lichtenstein estate, so it is assumed to no longer exist.

References
Footnotes

Other sources
 The Postage Stamps of Buenos Aires, by F. J. PEPLOW, London MCMXXV. Found at Royal Philatelic Society at London, Great Britain, and APS American Philatelic Research Library, Bellefonte, PA 16823
 Catalogo de los Sellos Postales de la Republica Argentina y Buenos Aires, Cordoba, Corrientes y Entre Rios. Edicion 8 1965, Edicion Especializada de dos tomos 1958

Postage stamps
Philately of Argentina
1859 in Argentina
1859 works